The E.R. Gibson House is a historic building located in Mason City, Iowa, United States.  Built in 1915, this two-story stucco structure exhibits a strong Prairie School influence.  It features a wide eaves, hip roof, a central chimney, and casement windows of leaded glass.   The house was listed on the National Register of Historic Places in 1980.

References

Houses completed in 1915
Prairie School architecture in Iowa
Houses in Mason City, Iowa
National Register of Historic Places in Mason City, Iowa
Houses on the National Register of Historic Places in Iowa